Tom Cardamone is an American writer of speculative fiction. His published works include the anthology The Lost Library: Gay Fiction Rediscovered, the fantasy novels The Werewolves of Central Park and Green Thumb, the novella Pacific Rimming and the short story collection Pumpkin Teeth.

Openly gay, Cardamone is based in New York City.

He won a Lambda Literary Award for Green Thumb in 2013, in the speculative fiction category. Pumpkin Teeth was also previously nominated in the same category.

References

External links 
Tom Cardamone

American fantasy writers
American male novelists
American gay writers
Living people
Lambda Literary Award winners
Writers from New York City
American LGBT novelists
American male short story writers
Year of birth missing (living people)
Place of birth missing (living people)
21st-century American novelists
21st-century American short story writers
21st-century American male writers
Novelists from New York (state)